Timoshinskaya is a rural locality (a village) in Mityukovskoye Rural Settlement, Vozhegodsky District, Vologda Oblast, Russia. The population was 1 as of 2002.

Geography 
The distance to Vozhega is 71 km, to Sosnovitsa is 3 km. Popovka, Vasilyevskaya, Kostyuninskaya are the nearest rural localities.

References 

Rural localities in Vozhegodsky District